The 1936 Utah State Aggies football team was an American football team that represented Utah State Agricultural College in the Rocky Mountain Conference (RMC) during the 1936 college football season. In their 18th season under head coach Dick Romney, the Aggies compiled a 7–0–1 record (6–0–1 against RMC opponents), won the RMC championship, and outscored opponents by a total of 99 to 13.

Halfback Kent Ryan received first-team All-American honors in 1936 from the All-America Board. Three Utah State players received first-team all-conference honors in 1936: Ryan; end Carl Mulleneaux; and guard Ed Peterson.

Schedule

References

Utah State
Utah State Aggies football seasons
Rocky Mountain Athletic Conference football champion seasons
Utah State Aggies football